Laurynas Grigelis and Zdeněk Kolář were the defending champions but only Kolář chose to defend his title, partnering Julian Ocleppo. Kolář successfully defended his title after defeating Luca Margaroli and Andrea Vavassori 6–4, 6–3 in the final.

Seeds

Draw

References

External links
 Main draw

Trofeo Faip-Perrel - Doubles
2020 Doubles